Nika Sichinava (born 17 August 1994) is a Georgian professional footballer who plays as a forward.

Club career
Sichinava is product of a youth club Yunist Chernihiv from Chernihiv, Ukraine. Sichinava made his debut at senior level for FC Retro Vatutine at the regional competitions in 2011, later in 2012 he played for FC Volgar Astrakhan. Sichinava left the Astrakhan club halfway into the 2013 season.

WIT Georgia
From 2013 to 2015 Sichinava returned to Georgia, signing with WIT Georgia, where he played 31 games and scored 3 goals.

Kolkheti-1913 Poti
In 2014 he moved to Kolkheti-1913 Poti in the Umaglesi Liga for two season, playing 38 goals and scoring 5 goals.

Inhulets Petrove
In 2016 Sichinava joined FC Inhulets Petrove. With the club he made it to the final of the 2018–19 Ukrainian Cup and got promoted to the 2019–20 Ukrainian First League.

On 19 September 2020, he scored his first goal in Ukrainian Premier League against Desna Chernihiv.

Kolos Kovalivka
In June 2021 he signed a three-year contract with Kolos Kovalivka in the Ukrainian Premier League and qualified for the 2021–22 Europa Conference League third qualifying round. On 24 July, he made his league debut with the team against Veres Rivne. On 5 August, he made his European debut against Shakhter Karagandy in the Europa Conference League third qualifying round, replacing Volodymyr Lysenko in the 54th minute. On 21 November he scored his first goal with the new club in Ukrainian Premier League against Desna Chernihiv at the Chernihiv Stadium giving the victory.

Loan to KuPS
On 22 March 2022, Sichinava joined KuPS in Finland on loan until 30 June 2022, with an option to extend the loan until the end of 2022. On 2 April, he made his debut for the club in the Veikkausliiga.

Career statistics

Club

Honours
Inhulets Petrove
Ukrainian First League: 2019–20
Ukrainian Cup runner-up: 2018–19

KuPS
Veikkausliiga: Runner-Up 2022

Individual
 Best Player of Round 12 of Ukrainian First League: 2019–20
 Best Player of Ukrainian First League: 2019–20
 Best Player of round 12 Ukrainian First League:2019–20
 Top Scorer of Ukrainian First League: Runner-up 2019–20

References

External links
 Profile on Official website of Kuopion Palloseura
 
 
 

1994 births
Living people
Sportspeople from Kutaisi
Ukrainian footballers
Footballers from Georgia (country)
Expatriate footballers from Georgia (country)
Expatriate footballers in Ukraine
Expatriate sportspeople from Georgia (country) in Ukraine
Expatriate footballers in Russia
Expatriate sportspeople from Georgia (country) in Russia
Expatriate footballers in Finland
Expatriate sportspeople from Georgia (country) in Finland
Association football forwards
FC Retro Vatutine players
FC Kolkheti-1913 Poti players
FC WIT Georgia players
FC Volgar Astrakhan players
FC Inhulets Petrove players
FC Inhulets-2 Petrove players
FC Yunist Chernihiv players
FC Kolos Kovalivka players
Kuopion Palloseura players
Erovnuli Liga players
Ukrainian Premier League players
Ukrainian First League players
Ukrainian Second League players
Russian Premier League players
Veikkausliiga players